Quintessa Swindell (born February 8, 1997) is an American actor. They are known for starring as Tabitha Foster in the Netflix teen drama Trinkets, and for briefly playing Anna in the HBO series Euphoria. They also star as Maxine Hunkel / Cyclone in the 2022 superhero film Black Adam.

Career
Swindell made their acting debut in 2019, playing Anna in the HBO television series Euphoria in the episode "The Trials and Tribulations of Trying To Pee While Depressed". The same year, they played a main role in the Netflix teen drama Trinkets as Tabitha Foster. Swindell has a role in the film Voyagers starring Colin Farrell and Tye Sheridan. In December 2020, they were cast in the role of Cyclone in the DCEU film Black Adam, starring Dwayne Johnson in the title role. They also appeared as Laila in season four of the HBO series In Treatment, which aired in 2021.

Swindell has been cast in Master Gardener starring Joel Edgerton and Sigourney Weaver.

Personal life
Swindell identifies as nonbinary, and uses they/he pronouns.

They grew up in Virginia Beach, Virginia and attended high school at the Governor's School for the Arts in Norfolk, Virginia. They were raised by a single father and had difficulty fitting into groups as a result of their gender and race. Swindell has said that due to not fitting stereotypes about all nonbinary people being androgynous, it has been difficult to find roles acting their own gender. However, they were happy to play a cisgender girl in Trinkets, given that the show explores Black identity, which spoke to them.

Filmography

Television

Film

Accolades

References

External links
 

21st-century American actors
American television actors
University of California, Santa Barbara alumni
Actors from New York (state)
American LGBT musicians
1997 births
American film actors
Living people
Yale School of Drama alumni
American non-binary actors
Queer actors
Queer artists
African-American actors
LGBT African Americans
21st-century African-American people
LGBT people from Virginia